Pulgas Ridge Open Space Preserve is a public recreation area in the Santa Cruz Mountains, San Mateo County in northern California. It is managed by the Midpeninsula Regional Open Space District (MROSD).

Trails provide views of San Francisco Bay and undeveloped hillsides. The reserve hosts the source of Cordilleras Creek.

History
The  that now comprise Pulgas were formerly a tuberculosis sanitarium owned by the City of San Francisco, the Hassler Health Farm. MROSD purchased the land in 1983. Buildings were demolished in 1985, and most of the non-native plants have been removed, but there are still some old retaining walls and steps off Hassler Trail.

Access

Pulgas Ridge Open Space Preserve is open from dawn to 1/2 hour after dusk. Dogs are permitted on leash, and off-leash at the large off-leash dog area. All trails are open to dogs, but leash rules apply except in the marked off-leash area. No bikes or horses.

See also
California mixed evergreen forest
California oak woodland

References

External links
 Midpeninsula Regional Open Space District: Pulgas Ridge webpage -  openspace.org

Santa Cruz Mountains
Midpeninsula Regional Open Space District
Nature reserves in California
Protected areas of San Mateo County, California